The first season of the American sketch comedy-variety show All That ran on April 16, 1994, as a special preview, but officially ran from January to April of 1995. The first season began in 1994-1995 with the pilot and 14 episodes. On April 16, 1994, Nickelodeon aired the All That pilot, which was the beginning of Season 1, the beginning of the "Golden Era", and the start of the All That series.

After You Can't Do That on Television ended production in 1990, Nickelodeon had interest in creating another sketch comedy series for the network. The network debuted another sketch show called Roundhouse in 1992. After the show's debut, Nickelodeon asked Mike Tollin and Brian Robbins to create a new show. The network wanted a show that was similar to Saturday Night Live, but for kids. Joe Davola, Kevin Kopelow, Dan Schneider and Heath Seifert were brought on as producers and were a major part of the writing force for the show.

Producers went on a search to finds kids to join the cast after the network green-lit the show. Angelique Bates, Lori Beth Denberg, Katrina Johnson, Kel Mitchell, Alisa Reyes, Josh Server, and Kenan Thompson were hired. Bates got a call from her agent about the show in late 1992. She auditioned by doing an impression of Steve Urkel, which she would get to do various times on the show. Denberg was discovered by producers at a drama competition; she was invited to audition and got the gig. Johnson, Mitchell, Reyes, Server, and Thompson went through a series of auditions to get on the show.

In 1994, Nickelodeon canceled Roundhouse and aired the pilot on April 16 of the same year. The show featured producer Kevin Kopelow as the stage manager which the cast members do something bad to him constantly, exclusively during the cold opens. The first season was broadcast from Orlando, Florida. The show's cold openings featured the cast in a green room and their departure from the room. To resemble Saturday Night Live, producers added the segment Vital Information which would be featured in every episode just like SNL's Weekend Update segment. Producers bumped Denberg up to anchor the segment.

The theme song for All That was performed by TLC. The intro features the entire cast in an alleyway. They are playing games and playing with a sheet with the All That logo on it. The cast jumps on unseen trampolines. The intro starts off with the announcer saying, "Not quite live, but ready for prime time. Get Ready, get set, it's All That." After that the All That theme song begins. It starts off with Johnson holding a sign of the word, "Oh". Then two people are shown playing racket ball in the alleyway. Then the cast is shown, with their names shown in bright red. Their first and last names are separated by the series' logo. The musical guest is shown after Thompson, the intro ends with a pan shot of the entire cast with the names of the producers flashing by.

Action League Now! aired as part of the show for two shorts. More were planned, but then the show was moved to All That's first spin-off, KaBlam!.

This season was taped from January 1994 to September 1994 at Nickelodeon Studios.

Cast
Repertory players

 Angelique Bates
 Lori Beth Denberg
 Katrina Johnson
 Kel Mitchell
 Alisa Reyes
 Josh Server
 Kenan Thompson

Notes

Episodes

See also
All That
 List of All That episodes

References

1994 American television seasons
1995 American television seasons
All That seasons